Stanisław Lorentz (28 April 1899 – 15 March 1991) was a Polish scholar of museology and history of art. He was director of the National Museum in Warsaw in the years 1935-1985, deputy to Sejm - the Polish Parliament (1965–69), and an UNESCO expert for the protection of monuments and historic sites.

Life
Born in Radom, Lorentz moved to Warsaw where he studied Philosophy and History of Art at Warsaw University. In 1924 he defended his doctoral thesis (a monograph of Ephraim Szreger - Warsaw architect of the Age of Enlightenment). He moved to Vilnius in 1929, where he worked as the Art conservation officer in the regions of Vilnius (e.g. protection of the ruins of Peninsula Castle in Trakai) and Novogrodek as well as lectured at the Stefan Batory University in Wilno (then in Poland, now Vilnius in Lithuania). From 1935 he was director of the National Museum in Warsaw. With the title of "Polish head of the museum under the German commissioner", he remained engaged at the National Museum.

He was a high-ranking member of the Polish Underground State during the German occupation of Poland, tasked with preserving Polish cultural heritage. After the war in 1945, he resumed his post as the director of the National Museum in Warsaw. In 1982 he was dismissed as a director because of joining the "Solidarity" movement. He became an honorary director from 1990 until his death in 1991.

In 1947 he became a professor at the University of Warsaw, in 1949 a member of Polish Academy of Learning, and in 1952, the Polish Academy of Sciences.

He was a member of several governmental departments and commissions related to art conservation and was also a deputy to Polish Sejm (1965–1969). He was a UNESCO expert on Polish and international cultural heritage, highly active in the restoration of the Royal Castle, Warsaw and Old Town in Havana, Cuba.

Lorentz conducted an intensive correspondence with Lithuanian art conservation specialist Vladas Drėma. The letters were published in 1998.

References 

1899 births
1991 deaths
Directors of museums in Poland
20th-century Polish historians
Polish male non-fiction writers
Polish politicians
Members of the Polish Academy of Learning
Academic staff of Vilnius University
Herder Prize recipients
Recipients of the State Award Badge (Poland)